Eavestone is a hamlet and civil parish in the Harrogate district of North Yorkshire, England. The population of the parish was estimated at 20 in 2012.

Eavestone was historically in the West Riding of Yorkshire.  It is mentioned in the Domesday Book, held by the Archbishop of York in 1086.  It remained an extra parochial area until 1743, when it was joined to the parish of Ripon.  It became a separate civil parish in 1866, and was transferred to North Yorkshire in 1974.

References

External links

Villages in North Yorkshire
Civil parishes in North Yorkshire